The Wenlan Pavilion, also known as the Imperial Wenlan Library, Imperial Library or Wenlan Ge, is a library and garden located in Hangzhou, Zhejiang Province, China. The library was one of the seven major collections of books built by the Qianlong Emperor of the Qing dynasty to house the Siku Quanshu and the only surviving one among the southern collections.

History 

The Wenlan Pavilion was built in 1782 (47th year of the Qianlong reign of the Qing dynasty) and completed in the following year. In 1853, Zhenjiang Wenzong Mansion and Yangzhou Wenhui Mansion were both destroyed by the Taiping Rebellion and were not restored after the war, but Wenlan Library collapsed in 1861 when the Taiping Army captured Hangzhou and was rebuilt in 1880. The Imperial Library is a typical Chinese garden in the centre of the West Lake.

It has a large gate facing the lake, followed by a flowery corridor, and through the rocky mountain cave you can see the imperial chambers. In the middle of the pond is the two-storey library building. On the eastern axis is the Luohan Hall and the Qing Dynasty Scholar's Residence Exhibition Hall which was rebuilt in 2009.

See also
List of Chinese gardens

External links
Wenlan Pavilion (Imperial Library), Hangchow
Wenlan Pavilion, Zhejiang Museum

References

Libraries in Zhejiang
Buildings and structures in Hangzhou
Major National Historical and Cultural Sites in Zhejiang
Gardens in China
1782 establishments in Asia
Qing dynasty architecture
Libraries established in 1782